New Tales of the Flying Fox is a 1984 Hong Kong film based on Louis Cha's novel The Young Flying Fox. The film was produced by the Shaw Brothers Studio and directed by Lau Sze-yuk.

Cast
 Felix Wong as Hu Fei
 Alex Man as Miao Renfeng
 Bryan Leung as Hu Yidao
 Tai Liang-chun as Cheng Lingsu
 Kara Hui as Yuan Ziyi
 Ku Kuan-chung as Tian Guinong
 Tong Chun-chung as Fuk'anggann
 Chan Si-kai as Nan Lan
 Jue Tin-who as Shi Wanjun
 Lam Fai-wong as Ping A'si
 Yuen Qiu as Hu Yidao's wife
 Yeung Chi-hing as Lord Nalan
 Chiu Man-yan as Yu Lan
 Lee Hang as Sun Fuhu
 Kong Chuen as Liu Hejun
 Lam Chi-tai
 Elvis Tsui
 Liu Yupu
 Jacky Yeung
 Wong Chi-wai
 Lee Fat-yuen
 Ho Po-sing
 Tam Bo
 Chan Siu-kai
 Fong Yue
 Cheung Chok-chow
 Ngai Tim-choi
 Bobby Wu
 Choi Kwok-keung
 Lau Chuen
 Chan Yuet-yue
 Kong Long
 Kam Tin-chue
 Cheung Hei

Plot
Two main figures of a rebellion, Wu Yi Dao and Miao Ren Feng are working together to further their cause, however, there are some tensions between the two. They agree to duel each other in order to discover who is the greater fighter, and who should have more power within the rebellion.
 
During the duel, Wu Yi Dao is killed, following this his wife commits suicide, unable to live without her husband. This leaves Miao Ren Feng as the only person left to raise their child, Wu Fei, as he is responsible for this situation he decides to raise the child.

However, Miao Ren Feng's younger brother attempts to kill the child, he is stopped by a servant who manages to save the child and escape with him. The servant then raises Wu Fei until he reaches adulthood, where he plots to seek revenge for the death of his parents.

External links
 
 

1984 films
Films based on works by Jin Yong
Hong Kong martial arts films
Shaw Brothers Studio films
Films set in the Qing dynasty
Wuxia films
Works based on Flying Fox of Snowy Mountain
1980s Hong Kong films